Bread and Jam for Frances is the second studio album by Switchblade Symphony.  It was recorded at Brilliant Studios in San Francisco and Private Island Trax in Hollywood and mastered at Private Island Trax. The original CD artwork erroneously listed 15 tracks, with "Harpsichord" at track 7, though that song was not on the CD and later pressings corrected the error. The positions of "Dirty Dog" and "roller Coaster" are also switched. The album peaked at #119 on the CMJ Radio Top 200.

Critical reception

Dean Carlson for AllMusic praised the album for taking the "darkwave pretensions of Switchblade Symphony's previous material and pushed it through an even more stylized electronic filter."

Mark Jenkins for the Washington Post said the album sounded similar to Siouxie and the Banshees but praised the instrumentals of Susan Wallace, nothing that "She incorporates hip-hop scratching, industrial rhythms and found sound into the band's music, giving tracks like "Roller Coaster" and "Harpsichord" a clattering vitality that belies their voice-from-the-grave ambience."

Track Listing 
 Witches – 4:18
 Dirty Dog – 4:22
 Roller Coaster – 2:49
 Situation #58 – 0:56
 Soldiers – 5:01
 Sleep – 3:01
 Funnel – 5:27
 Insect – 3:42
 Rampid – 3:04
 Situation #9 – 0:42
 Sheep – 4:24
 Fractal – 1:45
 Sick Mary – 0:58
 Episode G15 – 0:46

References 

1997 albums
Switchblade Symphony albums
Cleopatra Records albums